Gillian’s Wonderland Pier is a historic amusement park founded in 1929 by David Gillian, who first came to Ocean City in 1914.  It is located on the ocean boardwalk of the New Jersey shore.

History
David started his career in the orchestra at C. Elwood Carpenter's Dance Club (aka The Casino), located over the Moorlyn Theater on the old Boardwalk.  In 1917 he transferred to the Hippodrome pier, where he played with Robin Robinson's Orchestra. The Hippodrome had a movie theatre, vaudeville, dancing and amusements for children.

In October 1927, a fire destroyed the Hippodrome, after which the burned boardwalk was replaced in 1928. In 1930 David Gillian opened a Fun Deck at Plymouth Place and the Boardwalk. The two main attractions were a Ferris wheel and a Carousel. The Fun Deck was transformed into a water park (today known as OC Waterpark) after 1987.

In honor of his 100th birthday in 1990, David Gillian donated a horse from the Carousel to the Ocean City Historical Museum.  David Gillian died in March 1993 at the age of 102.

In 1957, David Gillian retired and his sons, Bob and Roy took over from 1957-1977.  In 1965 Roy left the family business and started Wonderland Pier at 6th Street and the Boardwalk (where Stainton's Playland had burned down 10 years prior), with 10 rides and a parking lot.

Roy became mayor of Ocean City in 1985, and retired from politics in 1989.  In 1994, Roy became the president of IAAPA (International Association of Amusement Parks and Attractions). His son, Jay Gillian, became mayor of Ocean City in 2010.

The Gillian family decided to expand their business beyond Ocean City by opening Gillian's Funland of Sea Isle City. Located on JFK Blvd. In January 2021 Gillian’s was under foreclosure but the Gillian family announced they would still be open for the 2021 season. On March 30 they announced they were teaming up with Icona Hotel owners to enhance the park. For the 2020 season they added a Huss Frisbee and for 2021 they have added a Super Fun Slide and a Larson/ARM Super Loop

Gillian's Wonderland Pier is mostly famous for its  Giant Wheel, one of the largest Ferris wheels on the east coast.

Former rides 
 City Jet (Anton Schwarzkopf 1976-2004)
 Runaway Train (L&T Systems 2006-2018)
 Miner Mike (Wisdom Rides 1998-2011)
 Fiesta Express (Zamperla 2011)
 Wild Wonder (Zamperla 1999)
 Sky Diver
 Salt and Pepper Shaker
 Twister (Zamperla)
 Sling Shot (Chance Rides 2004-2010, relocated to Gloria's Fantasyland)
 Alien Abduction (Wisdom Rides)

Inside Rides 
 Carousel (Philadelphia Toboggan Company #75 1926) - A Wonderland Pier tradition since 1972.  A decorative facade made to look like a Wurlitzer style #157 Military Band Organ by Kromer is included, but it does not provide the carousel's music. Minimum height to ride alone is 42 inches. The carousel was formerly at Rolling Green Park in Selinsgrove, Pennsylvania.
 The Frontier Express Monorail - A Wonderland Pier tradition since 1965. The ride originally was nicknamed, the “Red Raider” in honor of the nearby Ocean City High School mascot, it originally had 4 cars, and it only circled around the indoor area. However, in 1986, new cars, a Frontier theme, and an expanded layout were added to the ride. The cars now resemble Thomas the Tank Engine. The Minimum height to ride alone is 48 inches.
 Chopper Train-Manufacturered by SBF Visa Rides. The minimum height requirement for this ride is 32 inches to ride with a child over 36 inches, and 36 inches to ride alone. No teenagers or adults are allowed on this ride.
 Crazy Submarine-Manufactured by Zamperla. Minimum height to ride alone is 36 inches.
 Fire Engines-Manufactured by Pinto Bro’s. Operating since the 1940s. There is no height requirement for this ride. However, adults or teenagers aren’t allowed on this ride.
 Dune Buggies-Manufactured by Hampton. The Minimum height requirement is 30 inches. The maximum height requirement is 54 inches, and adults and teenagers aren’t allowed on this ride.
 Wet Boats-Manufactured by Alan Herschel. There is no height requirement for this ride. However, like Dune Buggies, Fire Engines, Frogs, Mini Scooters, Chopper Train, and Bungee Jump, adults or teenagers aren’t allowed on this ride.
 Super Fun Slide-Manufactured by Frederiksen Industries.
 Rocky And The Railroad Ramblers (nicknamed The Man & Dog/The Man & Dog Show) - An Animatronic band that debuted in 1993. This is located between the Loading and Unloading platforms of the Monorail, and it costs $1 to play 1 of 7 country songs. Some notable ones they play are Cotton Eye Joe, Rocky Top, Your Cheating Heart, and Country Roads. It consists of 5 characters, including Rocky (a panda), Bubba (a mountain lion), Henrietta (a chicken), Hank (a Dalmatian), and Antonio (a Human). This show is a retrofit of a former Pizza Time Theatre animatronic band.

Mid-Deck Rides 
A Wonderland Pier tradition since 1989. A new Technical Park model was built in 2001, as well as its farther away from the Log Flume than it the 1989-2000 Giant Wheel . The minimum height requirement for this ride is 48 inches to ride alone.
 Musik Express-Manufactured by Bertazzon. This ride replaced an older Himalaya in 2000. The minimum height requirement for this ride is 44 inches to ride, and 48 inches to ride alone.
 Raiders-Manufactured by Wisdom Rides. The minimum height requirement for this attraction is 38 inches to ride, and 42 inches to ride alone.
  Balloon Race-Manufactured by Zamperla. Minimum height to ride is 32 inches, and 42 inches to ride alone.
 Kite Flyer-Manufactured by Zamperla. The minimum height requirement for this ride is 36 inches to ride, and 42 inches to ride alone.
 Wacky Worm Roller Coaster There was an old Wacky Worm model that operated at the park from 2005-2010, but that model was relocated to the smaller Gillian’s Funland in Sea Isle City from 2011-2013. However, a newer Wacky Worm model was purchased in 2012 and it made a comeback to the park that same year. After 2013, the old Wacky Worm model now operates at Alabama Splash Adventure in Bessemer, Alabama as Centi-Speed. Manufactured by Fajume. The minimum height requirement is 36 inches to ride, and 42 inches to ride alone. The park added a new paint scheme for the 2021 season.
 Glass House-Manufactured In-House. There is no height requirement. However, all riders must keep their hands in front of them and walk slowly, as they progress through the maze.
 Swings-Manufactured by Barock. This model replaced an older model originally on the lower deck in 2018. The minimum height requirement for this ride is 42 inches to ride alone.
Bungee Jump-Unknown manufacturer. The minimum height requirement for this ride is 36 inches. The maximum weight is 240 lbs. No teenagers or adults are allowed on this ride.
Jumbo-Manufactured by Zamperla. The minimum height requirement for this ride is 36 inches without an adult.

Lower Lot Rides 
 Canyon Falls Log Flume - A Wonderland Pier tradition since 1992. Manufactured by Hopkins Rides. The minimum height requirement for this ride is 42 inches without an adult.
 Skooter Bumper Cars-Manufactured by Bertazzon. The minimum height requirement to ride is 42 inches, and 50 inches without an adult.
 Moby Dick-Manufacturered by Wisdom Rides. The minimum height requirement for this ride is 42 inches to ride, and 48 inches to ride alone 
 Haunted House Dark Ride-Manufactured by Sally Corporation. The minimum height requirement for this ride is 36 inches to ride, and 48 inches to ride alone.
 Tilt-A-Whirl by Sellner Manufacturing. This ride replaced a portable 4 car version, commonly found at fairgrounds in 2000, with a six car version, and a rotating floor. The minimum height requirement for this ride is 36 inches without an adult.
 Speedway-Manufactured by Zamperla. The minimum height requirement for this ride is 36 inches without an adult.
 Bear Affair-Manufactured by Sellner Manufacturing. This ride replaced a portable 4 car version, commonly found at fairgrounds in 2000, with a six car version, and a rotating floor. The minimum height requirement for this ride is 36 inches without an adult.
 Ring of Fire

Upper Deck Rides 

 Ferris Wheel Fiesta Balloon
 Frisbee-Manufacturered by Huss. The minimum height requirement to ride is 54 inches. 
 Dragon Wagon Coaster

Accidents
Wild Wonder

On August 28, 1999, two people were killed and two injured when a roller-coaster car lost traction with the rails on a steep ascent and plunged backwards. The ride involved with the accident was the Wild Wonder.

Canyon Falls Log Flume

On July 22, 2007, 5 people were injured after a loose bolt was believed to be the cause of a malfunction on the ride, causing two logs to collide with each other.

Speedway

On August 25, 2013, a 4 year old girl was on the platform of the ride as it was about to start. She was then transported to the hospital shortly after. According to a spokeswoman from the NJ Department of Labor & Community Affairs, “the accident was caused by operator error, and the operator was later fired. There were no mechanical problems with the ride.

Ferris Wheel

On May 2, 2022, "a subcontractor died after falling from a lift while working on the Ferris wheel."

References

External links

Amusement parks in New Jersey
Water parks in New Jersey
1929 establishments in New Jersey
Ocean City, New Jersey
Tourist attractions in Cape May County, New Jersey